Adrenaline is a hormone and neurotransmitter also known as epinephrine.

Adrenalin(e) may also refer to:

Medicine
 Adrenalin, a trademarked epinephrine (medication) product of Pfizer

Music
 Adrenalin (band), an American rock group
 Adrenaline (album), a 1995 album by Deftones
 Adrenalin, a 2010 album by Faizal Tahir
 "Adrenaline", a song by Bauhaus on the album Go Away White
 "Adrenaline", a song by Emma Pollock on the album Watch the Fireworks
 "Adrenaline" (Gavin Rossdale song), 2002
 "Adrenaline" (Shinedown song), 2013
 "Adrenalin/Distant Dreams (Part Two)", a 1980 single by Throbbing Gristle
 "Adrenaline", a song by 12 Stones on the 2007 album Anthem for the Underdog
 "Adrenaline", a song by The Roots on the 1999 album Things Fall Apart
 "Adrenaline", a song by Rosetta Stone (band) on the 1993 album Adrenaline
 Adrenaline, a 2003-2012 metal band
 Adrenaline, a song from their 2004 EP Inspired by Anger used in FlatOut

Other
 Adrenaline (autobiography), by Zlatan Ibrahimović
 Adrenaline (novel), by James Robert Baker
 Adrenalin: Fear the Rush, a 1996 action film
 ADRenalin (Luxembourg), the youth wing of the Alternative Democratic Reform Party, a conservative political party in Luxembourg
 Adrenaline (film), a 2015 film
 Adrenalin (character), a character in the Asterix comic Asterix and the Chieftain's Daughter
 AMD Radeon Software, Adrenalin Edition

See also
Adrenalina (disambiguation)